is a railway station on the Uetsu Main Line in the city of Agano, Niigata, Japan, operated by East Japan Railway Company (JR East). It is the main train station for the city of Agano.

Lines
Suibara Station is served by the Uetsu Main Line and is 10.2 kilometers from the starting point of the line at Niitsu Station.

Station layout
The station consists of two ground-level opposed side platforms serving two tracks with the platforms connected by a footbridge. However, only one of the platforms is in normal use, and serves bi-directional traffic. The station has a "Midori no Madoguchi" staffed ticket office.

Platforms

History
Suibara Station opened on 2 September 1912. With the privatization of Japanese National Railways (JNR) on 1 April 1987, the station came under the control of JR East.

Passenger statistics
In fiscal 2017, the station was used by an average of 787 passengers daily (boarding passengers only).

Surrounding area

 Agano City Hall
 Agano Post Office
 Niigata Prefectural Agano High School
 Agano Elementary School
 Suibara Elementary School
 Suibara Magistrate's Office
 Lake Hyōko

See also
 List of railway stations in Japan

References

External links

 JR East station information 

Stations of East Japan Railway Company
Railway stations in Niigata Prefecture
Uetsu Main Line
Railway stations in Japan opened in 1912
Agano, Niigata